C. moritziana may refer to:

 Canna moritziana, a perennial plant
 Coespeletia moritziana, a flowering plant
 Coussarea moritziana, a New World plant